Dayton Township is a township in Iowa County, Iowa, USA.

History
Dayton Township was established in 1857.

References

Townships in Iowa County, Iowa
1857 establishments in Iowa
Populated places established in 1857
Townships in Iowa